Mohammadabad-e Shah Nur (also Romanized as Moḩammadābād-e Shah Nūr) is a village in Nazil Rural District, Nukabad District, Khash County, Sistan and Baluchestan Province, Iran. At the 2006 census, its population was 54, in 11 families.

References 

Populated places in Khash County